Howard Redfern Morris FRS is a British biochemist.

He worked at Imperial College as a lecturer  from 1975 to 1978, as a Reader in Protein Chemistry from 1978 to 1980, and as Professor  (later Emeritus) of Biological Chemistry, from 1980.

He is President and CSO, BiopharmaSpec Ltd and serves as a member of the audit committee, of the Institute of Cancer Research.

He was elected a Fellow of the Royal Society in 1988, and in 2014 received the Society's Royal Medal:

References

External links 

 

Year of birth missing (living people)
Place of birth missing (living people)
British biochemists
Living people